Pronger Bros. Ranch Airport  is a privately owned, public use airport located eight nautical miles (15 km) southwest of the central business district of Stratford, in Sherman County, Texas, United States.

Facilities 
Pronger Bros. Ranch Airport covers an area of 45 acres (18 ha) at an elevation of 3,722 feet (1,134 m) above mean sea level. It has two runways with turf surfaces: 17/35 is 4,100 by 40 feet (1,250 x 12 m) and 6/24 is 3,500 by 40 feet (1,067 x 12 m).

References

External links 
  at Texas DOT Airport Directory
 Aerial photo as of March 1997 from USGS The National Map via MSR Maps
 Aeronautical chart at SkyVector

Defunct airports in Texas
Airports in Texas
Transportation in Sherman County, Texas